Sea Ghost may refer to:
 "Sea Ghost", a 2003 song by the Unicorns  from Who Will Cut Our Hair When We're Gone?
 Lockheed Sea Ghost, a proposed unmanned combat airplane by Lockheed
 The Sea Ghost, a 1931 American film by William Nigh

See also
Funayūrei, sea ghosts in Japanese mythology
Shōjō, a sea spirit in Japanese mythology